Elk Creek is a stream in central to northeast Wright County, Missouri. It is a tributary of the Gasconade River.

The stream headwaters arise some eight miles north-northwest of Hartville between the communities of Loring and Durbin. The stream flows to the north and northeast passing under routes H and Z to its confluence with the Gasconade in northern Wright County about 1.5 miles southeast of Competition in southern Laclede County.

Elk Creek was so named on account of elk in the area.

See also
List of rivers of Missouri

References

Rivers of Wright County, Missouri
Rivers of Missouri